Oenopota obliqua is a species of sea snail, a marine gastropod mollusk in the family Mangeliidae.

Description
The length of the shell varies between 8 mm and 11 mm.

The turriculated shell has shouldered whorls. The shoulder is acute and tuberculated by the terminations of thirteen to sixteen narrow oblique ribs. The much wider interspaces are covered by revolving striae. The aperture is rather short and broadly truncate below.

Distribution
This species occurs in European waters (Northern Norway - Arctic Russia) and in the arctic waters of [Eastern [Canada]].

References

 Sars, G.O. (1878). Bidrag til Kundskaben om Norges arktiske Fauna. I. Mollusca Regionis Arcticae Norvegiae. Oversigt over de i Norges arktiske Region Forekommende Bløddyr. Brøgger, Christiania. xiii + 466 pp., pls 1–34 & I-XVIII
 Gofas, S.; Le Renard, J.; Bouchet, P. (2001). Mollusca, in: Costello, M.J. et al. (Ed.) (2001). European register of marine species: a check-list of the marine species in Europe and a bibliography of guides to their identification. Collection Patrimoines Naturels, 50: pp. 180–213

External links
 

obliqua
Gastropods described in 1878